The men's pole vault event at the 1999 Summer Universiade was held on 9 and 10 July at the Estadio Son Moix in Palma de Mallorca, Spain.

Medalists

Results

Qualification
Qualification: 5.40 (Q) or at least 12 best performers (q) advance to the final

Final

References

Results

Athletics at the 1999 Summer Universiade
1999